The Dalun Lake is a lake in Neihu District, Taipei, Taiwan.

Transportation
The lake is accessible north of Neihu Park Station of Taipei Metro.

See also
 Geography of Taiwan
 List of lakes of Taiwan

References

Lakes of Taipei